The following lists include the extreme and significant geographic points of the islands of the Caribbean Sea.

Extreme points

Highest points
Pico Duarte, Dominican Republic, Hispaniola  — highest summit of the Caribbean at 3175 m (10,417 feet)

Lowest points
Lago Enriquillo, Dominican Republic, Hispaniola  — lowest lake on an island and lowest surface point on an ocean island on Earth at −46 m (−151 feet).
Isthmus of Rivas, Rivas, Nicaragua  — lowest pass between Caribbean Sea and Pacific Ocean on the Continental Divide of the Americas at 56 m (184 feet)

Islands
Island of Cuba  — most extensive island of the Caribbean at 104,556 km2 (40,369 square miles)
Hispaniola  — tallest island of the Caribbean at 3175 m (10,417 feet) and second most extensive island of the Caribbean at 76,480 km2 (29,529 square miles)

Lakes
The biggest lake in the Caribbean is the Lake Enriquillo.

Rivers

See also
Geography of North America
Geography of Canada
Extreme points of the Earth
Extreme points of the Americas
Extreme points of North America
Extreme points of Canada
Extreme points of Canadian provinces
Extreme communities of Canada
Extreme points of Greenland
Extreme points of Mexico
Extreme points of the United States
Extreme points of U.S. states
Extreme points of Massachusetts
Extreme Points of Texas
Extreme points of New England
Extreme points of Central America
Extreme points of the Caribbean
Extreme points of Cuba
Extreme points of South America
Extreme points of Argentina
Extreme points of Brazil
Extreme points of Chile
Extreme points of Colombia
Extreme points of Peru

Notes

References

External links

Caribbean
Geography of the Caribbean
Caribbean